Carlos Arévalo (born 6 December 1993) is a Spanish sprint canoeist.

He won the silver medal in the Men's K-4 500 metres event at the 2020 Summer Olympics in Tokyo with Saúl Craviotto, Marcus Walz and Rodrigo Germade. He won a medal at the 2019 ICF Canoe Sprint World Championships.

References

External links

1993 births
Living people
ICF Canoe Sprint World Championships medalists in kayak
Spanish male canoeists
Olympic canoeists of Spain
Canoeists at the 2020 Summer Olympics
Medalists at the 2020 Summer Olympics
Olympic medalists in canoeing
Olympic silver medalists for Spain
21st-century Spanish people